N. fenestrata may refer to:
 Neopanorpa fenestrata, Needham, 1909, a scorpionfly species in the genus Neopanorpa found in India
 Nephila fenestrata, Thorell, 1859, a spider species in the genus Nephila found in South Africa
 Notoacmea fenestrata, the fenestrate limpet, a sea snail species in the genus Notoacmea

See also
 Fenestrata (disambiguation)